The Orange Beach Sportsplex is a sports complex in Orange Beach, Alabama that was built in 2001.

The focus of the complex is the 1,500-seat stadium. The stadium has hosted the SEC Women's Soccer Tournament and has completed negotiations to host the tournament through 2020. The facility also hosts the NCAA Division II men's and women's soccer tournaments. Currently the stadium hosts the Alabama Lightning of the North American Football League.

Aside from the stadium, the sportsplex is home to baseball, softball, and youth sports leagues.

The city of Orange Beach has announced plans to upgrade lighting on the championship field as part of the tournament contract.

References

External links
Orange Beach Parks & Rec - Sportsplex
Satellite view from Google Maps

Soccer venues in Alabama
High school football venues in the United States
Baseball venues in Alabama
Buildings and structures in Baldwin County, Alabama
2001 establishments in Alabama
Sports venues completed in 2001
Softball venues in the United States
Sports complexes in the United States